The decade of the 1630s in archaeology involved some significant events.

Explorations

Excavations

Finds

Events
 1632: Posthumous publication of Antonio Bosio's Roma Sotterranea, the results of his lifelong systematic exploration of the Roman catacombs.

Births
 1633: Giovanni Giustino Ciampini, Italian archeologist (d. 1698)
 1635: February 1 - Marquard Gude, German archaeologist (d. 1689).

Deaths

References

Archaeology by decade
Archaeology